= Mental therapy =

Mental therapy may refer to:

- Psychiatry
- Psychotherapy
